Paramesosella gigantea is a species of beetle in the family Cerambycidae. It was described by Stephan von Breuning in 1948. It is known from Borneo.

References

Pteropliini
Beetles described in 1948